Marc S. Jacobus (born 1951) is a professional American bridge player from Las Vegas, Nevada.

Bridge accomplishments

Wins
 North American Bridge Championships (7)
 Blue Ribbon Pairs (1) 2000 
 Nail Life Master Open Pairs (1) 1972 
 Vanderbilt (2) 1995, 2002 
 Senior Knockout Teams (1) 2010 
 Keohane North American Swiss Teams (1) 1986 
 Roth Open Swiss Teams (1) 2007

Runners-up
 North American Bridge Championships
 Grand National Teams (2) 1995, 2002 
 Jacoby Open Swiss Teams (4) 1989, 2006, 2009, 2011 
 Truscott Senior Swiss Teams (1) 2011 
 Vanderbilt (1) 2007 
 Senior Knockout Teams (1) 2011 
 Keohane North American Swiss Teams (1) 2002 
 Reisinger (1) 1974 
 Roth Open Swiss Teams (1) 2009 
 Spingold (1) 2000

Notes

Living people
American contract bridge players
1951 births
Place of birth missing (living people)
Date of birth missing (living people)
People from the Las Vegas Valley